Navagattegama is a village in Sri Lanka's north-west province, near Anamaduwa.

See also Simon Navagattegama

Populated places in North Western Province, Sri Lanka